Isi Israel Metzstein OBE (7 July 1928 – 10 January 2012) was a German-born architect who worked at Gillespie, Kidd & Coia and taught at the Glasgow School of Art. He became known for his postwar architectural designs working in the European modernist style of Le Corbusier and the American Frank Lloyd Wright.

Early life 
Isidore Israel Metzstein, called Isi Metzstein, was born in the Mitte district of Berlin in 1928, one of five children. His parents, Efraim and Rachel Metzstein, were Polish Jews who had moved to Germany in 1920. Isi had an older sister, Lee, an older brother, Josef, a twin sister, Jenny, and a younger brother, Leo, In 1933, Isi's father, Efraim, died leaving his mother to raise the five children on her own.

In November 1938, after Kristallnacht had seen Isi's school set on fire, his mother saw to it that her children were kept safe by sending the 10-year-old Isi and his siblings to Britain on the Kindertransport. With his brothers and sisters scattered around the UK, Isi was taken in by a family in Hardgate, Clydebank before they could all be reunited once more, eventually settling in Glasgow.

Career 
After leaving Hyndland School in 1945, Isi's professional career as an architect began with taking evening classes in architecture at the Glasgow School of Art and an apprenticeship under Jack Coia at Gillespie, Kidd & Coia.  Whilst at the Glasgow School of Art, Isi met Andy MacMillan and the two became friends, often going for drinks together in the Kings Arms on Elmbank Street.

When Andy MacMillan joined the firm in 1954, the pair designed many churches, colleges & schools together in the Modernist style.

In 1969, Isi began teaching at the Glasgow School of Art. and became Professor of Architecture at the University of Edinburgh in 1984 before returning to teach in Glasgow in 1991.

Notable designs 
 St. Paul's Church, Glenrothes (1957)
 St. Bride's Church, East Kilbride (1962)
 Halls of Residence, University of Hull (1963-67)
 St. Patrick's Church, Kilsyth (1964)
 Our Lady of Good Counsel, Dennistoun (1965)
 St. Peter's Seminary (1966).
Notre Dame College, Bearsden (1968–69)
 St. Benedict's, Drumchapel (1970)
 St Margaret's Hospice, Clydebank (1970)
 St Margaret's RC Church, Clydebank (1970)
 The Library at Wadham College, Oxford. (1971-1977)
 Cumbernauld Technical College (1972)
 Robinson College, Cambridge.(1974-1980)
 Bonar Hall, Dundee (1975)
Glasgow School of Art refectory (1981)

Awards 
 Royal Scottish Academy Gold Medal (1975).
 RIAS Lifetime Achievement Award 2008 (with MacMillan)
 Honorary RIBA Fellowship
 RIBA Annie Spink Prize for Education 2008 (with MacMillan)

Personal life
Isi married Danielle Kahn in 1967  and the pair had three children, Mark, Saul and Ruth.

He died on 10 January 2012 at their home in Dowanhill, Glasgow.

Legacy
Writing of Isi Metzstein's passing for Architectural Review, Clare Wright noted that:"With a change of ethos post war, Coia ceded much of the design control to the young Isi and Andy. An early project for St Paul’s Church in Glenrothes (1957) is a modest building of simple form and materials, yet exhibits an extraordinary quality of light and monumental presence which owed much to Le Corbusier. The sixteen churches that followed formed a distinctive body of work. Combining functional requirements with resonant symbolism, they were the perfect vehicle for developing an architectural philosophy, which reached its most mature expression in the design for St Peter’s Seminary at Cardross."

See also
 Andy Macmillan
 Gillespie, Kidd & Coia
 The Glasgow School of Art

References

1928 births
2012 deaths
Architects from Glasgow
Alumni of the Glasgow School of Art
Officers of the Order of the British Empire
German emigrants to the United Kingdom